Vadlamannadu Halt railway station (station code:VMD), is railway station in Vadlamannadu of Krishna district. This railway station is administered under Vijayawada railway division of South Coast Railway Zone.

References 

Railway stations in Vijayawada railway division
Railway stations in Krishna district